Fortune Island is a resort island of Batangas province in the Philippines.

Ownership and development

Fortune Island was once a private island owned by Laurentina Pestano. It was turned over to the government and the island is now owned by José Antonio Leviste, a former governor of Batangas. Leviste opened the Fortune Island Resort Club on the island in 1995. The beach resort was built along a  stretch of pristine white sand. Several rest houses face the water. The resort features a salt water swimming pool, clubhouse, cabana, basketball court, helipad, desalinator for freshwater consumption, and a small serpentarium, a reptile zoo for snakes. The beach also has an acropolis with Grecian pillars and statues on the edge of the island overlooking the sea. There is also a museum dedicated to the San Diego, a Spanish warship that sank off the island (see below).

This island has since been parceled out into seven lots reportedly titled in the names of three companies: Fortune Resort Club, Inc., Meridian Pacific Hotel Corp., and Batangas Bay Development, Inc. Leviste holds either majority stocks or has interests in these companies.

Some government officials believe that Leviste's ownership of Fortune Island underwent “scheming procedures” to acquire both judicial and administrative titles. These officials believe that these titles should never have been granted for two reasons; firstly, the island is classified as a marine reserve under Proclamation 1801, issued in 1978 by President Ferdinand Marcos and, secondly, Section 16 of Presidential Decree 705 (the Revised Forestry Code), which provides that "areas less than 250 hectares which are far from, or are not contiguous with, any certified alienable and disposable land" are "areas needed for forest purposes and may not, therefore, be classified as alienable and disposable land." Some government officials further contend that subdividing Fortune Island into lots was a "ploy" to skirt environmental and other pertinent laws.

Shipwrecks

The shipwreck was discovered in 1992 by French underwater archaeologist Franck Goddio.

The island has also been the site of modern shipwrecks. On December 13, 1995, the MV Kimelody Cristy, a passenger ferry owned and operated by Moreta Shipping Lines Incorporated, caught fire and sank off Fortune Island as it was on its way to Mindoro, leaving 17 people dead and 16 people missing. On September 18, 1998, the MV Princess of the Orient, a passenger ferry owned by Sulpicio Lines, sailed during a typhoon on its way to Cebu City from Manila and sank off Fortune Island, resulting in the deaths of 70 people.

References

External links
 

Islands of Batangas
Resorts in the Philippines
Beaches of the Philippines
Tourist attractions in Batangas
Private islands of the Philippines